College Kumar is a 2020 Indian comedy film written and directed by Hari Santhosh. A remake of director's own 2017 Kannada film of the same name, it was simultaneously shot in Tamil and Telugu languages, with Prabhu starring in Tamil and Rajendra Prasad replacing him in Telugu. Rahul Vijay, Priya Vadlamani and Madhoo co-star in both versions. College Kumar was released on 6 March 2020 in both languages.

Plot 

Thiru Kumaran, a peon, wants to make his son an auditor because his employer, an arrogant auditor, insults him. As time passes by, his son, Shiva Kumar disappoints him by not being a bright student at college. Thiru's wife Janaki too is upset over the same. He loses his cool when Kumar is terminated from college for indulging in a malpractice. An infuriated Kumar vents out his frustration to his father and challenges him to join college and earn a degree. How Thiru takes up the challenge forms the rest of the story.

Cast 
 Prabhu as Thiru Kumaran / Rajendra Prasad as Sasi Kumar
 Rahul Vijay as Shiva Kumar
 Priya Vadlamani as Avantika
 Madhoo as Janaki
 Nassar as Santhosh Kumar (Tamil) / Prakash Kumar (Telugu)
 Manobala
 Chaams
 Avinash as Kaliyamurthy (Tamil)

Production 
In April 2019, it was reported that the Kannada film College Kumar would be remade in Tamil and Telugu languages, with both versions being shot simultaneously. Hari Santhosh was confirmed to be directing both remakes, while the producers of the original too would be retained. Principal photography began in the same month. Though the cast was largely the same in both versions, Prabhu was exclusive to the Tamil version and Rajendra Prasad to Telugu. It was also the Tamil cinema debuts of Rahul Vijay and Priya Vadlamani.

Themes 
Hari Santhosh has stated that, through College Kumar, he intends to convey the message that "it's never too late to learn."

Soundtrack 
The soundtrack was composed by Qutub-E-Kripa. It was released via Sony Music India.

Release and reception 
College Kumar was released on 6 March 2020 in both Tamil and Telugu versions. Reviewing the Telugu version, Neeshita Nyayapati of The Times of India rated it 2 stars out of 5, praising the premise but criticised its execution, saying it "makes it seem like leftover material from the 90s or early 2000s." 123 Telugu, review the Telugu version, opined that "Except for Rahul Vijay and Rajendra Prasad’s performance, there is nothing much to look forward to in this film which is like old wine in an old bottle". Reviewing the Tamil version, Thinkal Menon of The Times of India also rated it 2 stars out of 5, saying, "College Kumar has the issues which most of the remake versions suffer. The project, which has been made simultaneously in [Telugu] as well, looks like a Telugu film in many scenes, thanks to the location and artistes who play the minor supporting roles." Maalai Malar, however, reviewed the Tamil version more positively, praising its comedy.

References

External links 
 

2020 comedy films
2020 films
2020 multilingual films
2020s Tamil-language films
2020s Telugu-language films
Indian comedy films
Indian multilingual films
Tamil remakes of Kannada films
Telugu remakes of Kannada films
Films directed by Hari Santhosh